Quri Daraq or Quri Doroq may refer to:
 Quri Daraq, Ardabil
 Quri Daraq, alternate name of Qeshlaq-e Quzlu, Ardabil Province
 Quri Daraq, West Azerbaijan